Selden Chapin (September 19, 1899 – March 26, 1963) was a career foreign service officer and United States diplomat.

Biography
Selden Chapin was born in Erie, Pennsylvania, the son of Captain Frederic Lincoln Chapin (who was commander of the battle ship Wyoming) and his wife Grace Card (Selden) Chapin. He graduated from the United States Naval Academy in 1919 and served in the U.S. Navy from 1919 to 1925. He married Mary Paul Noyes, March 30, 1927.

He was appointed a foreign service officer in March 1925. After the liberation of Paris in August 1944, he served as Charge d'Affaires in the American Embassy in the absence of an ambassador, since France formally broke off diplomatic relations with the U.S. after the Torch Invasion of North Africa in November 1942. Jefferson Caffery assumed the ambassadorship on 30 December 1944.  Later Chapin was the U.S. ambassador to Hungary, Iran, Netherlands, Peru and Panama. Chapin and his wife are interred in Arlington National Cemetery.

His son was Frederic L. Chapin, ambassador to Ethiopia and Guatemala. His niece and ward is Hope Cooke, former wife of the last king of Sikkim, Palden Thondup Namgyal.

References

1899 births
1963 deaths
Ambassadors of the United States to Iran
Ambassadors of the United States to the Netherlands
Ambassadors of the United States to Panama
Ambassadors of the United States to Peru
Burials at Arlington National Cemetery
Chapin family
Directors General of the United States Foreign Service
People from Erie, Pennsylvania
Military personnel from Pennsylvania
United States Foreign Service personnel
20th-century American diplomats